Ion Pantelimonescu (born 15 May 1956) is a Romanian fencer. He competed in the team sabre event at the 1980 Summer Olympics.

References

1956 births
Living people
Romanian male fencers
Romanian sabre fencers
Olympic fencers of Romania
Fencers at the 1980 Summer Olympics